Suckers is a 2001 American comedy-drama film directed by Roger Nygard, who co-wrote the story with Joe Yanetty. It is about the car sales business in the United States, and stars Joe Yannetty, Jake Johannsen, Daniel Benzali, Michael D. Roberts, Louis Mandylor and Lori Loughlin.

Premise
Bobby (played by Louis Mandylor) is nice-guy looking for work. He also owes a lot of money to these loan sharks, Chad and Everett. One day he walks into Southside Motors in L.A., and takes a job as a car salesman. This is where it all happens and he enters into the shady world of car sales. The dealership manager (played by Daniel Benzali) is a bald headed bully who has no qualms about screwing the customer. Unfortunately for Bobby, he doesn't have the knack for screwing the customers. Things are further complicated when the loan sharks come to collect money that Bobby owes them.

Cast

Background
The story for the film was written by Joe Yanetty and Roger Nygard who is a stand-up comic and former car salesman. Nygard also directed the film. For the story, Nygard drew on accounts that he had heard from his car dealer friends. One was about a woman who used sex to steal a car and left the salesman stranded and naked.

Premiere and awards
The film had its premiere at the Comedy Arts Festival in Aspen. The film was a 2001 Video Premiere Award Winner in the Screenplay category, beating Tony Johnston's Full Disclosure by David Davis and Brian Cox, O.K. Garage by Brandon Cole, and Doug Campbell's The Tomorrow Man. It was shown at the 2000 Cinequest Film Festival. It picked up an award at the festival in the "Special Jury Artistic Merit Award" category. It was also an entrant at the Waterfront Film Festival.

The film has played on HBO and Cinemax.

Releases
 Sucker$ - Sand Hill SH 0061 - 2001
 Suckers - Planet - 2001
 Suckers - Victory Multimedia - 2001
 Suckers - Razor Digital Entertainment - 2004
 Tough Guys: Suckers / Sex and Bullets - Razor - 2005

References

External links
 
 
 Robert Reviews Stuff: Suckers (2001)
 Fast, Cheap Movie Thoughts: Roger Nygard on "Suckers"

American comedy-drama films
2001 comedy-drama films
Films set in Los Angeles
American business films
Films about automobiles
Films about car dealerships
2001 films
2000s English-language films
Films directed by Roger Nygard
2000s American films